Welse is a river of Brandenburg, Germany. It flows into the Hohensaaten-Friedrichsthaler Wasserstraße, a shipping canal parallel to the Oder, north of Schwedt.

See also
List of rivers of Brandenburg

Rivers of Brandenburg
Rivers of Germany